Ngong Hills Wind Power Station, also Ngong Hills Wind Farm, is a wind-powered power station in Kenya.

Location

The coordinates of the power station are:1°22'51.9"S, 36°38'08.0"E (Latitude:-1.381071; Longitude:36.635542). The wind is strongest in the evening and in March, and weakest in the morning and in July, contrasting with Lake Turkana Wind Power Station.

History
Ngong Hills Power Station was initially commissioned in 1993 with two wind turbines donated by the government of Belgium. After those two turbines were retired, the installation of new hardware led to a second commissioning in August 2009, with capacity of 5.1 MW. Beginning in 2013, Kenya Electricity Generating Company, who own and operate the wind farm and power station began adding new turbines and by 2015, when the work was completed, the power station's generation capacity had increased to 25.5 megawatts.

See also

 List of power stations in Kenya
 Wind power in Kenya
 Lake Turkana Wind Power Station
 Kinangop Wind Park

References

External links
 KenGen
 Ministry of Energy and Petroleum (Kenya)
 Energy Regulation Commission (Kenya)
 Kenya Power

1993 establishments in Kenya
Wind farms in Kenya
Buildings and structures in Rift Valley Province
Kajiado County
Energy companies established in 1993
Renewable resource companies established in 1993